Seymareh is a river in southwestern Iran formed by the confluence of the Gharehsoo and Ghamasiab rivers in an area around southwest Kermanshah. Seymareh converges with Kashkan just before the historical Gavmishan Bridge near Darreh Shahr to create Karkheh River, an important river in Iran. The change of names from Seymareh to Karkheh is sometimes also considered farther downstream (at the mouth of Zal river at the border to the Khuzestan province).

The Seymareh Dam, a 480MW hydroelectric power station is located on the lower course of Seymareh near Cheshmeh Shirin, Darreh Shahr.

References

Rivers of Kermanshah Province
Rivers of Lorestan Province
Rivers of Ilam Province